The Hollywood Takes is a novel written by the English author Michael de Larrabeiti and published in the United States by Doubleday in 1988.

1988 British novels
Novels by Michael de Larrabeiti
Doubleday (publisher) books
Hollywood novels